Fringe may refer to:

Arts and music
 "The Fringe", or Edinburgh Festival Fringe, the world's largest arts festival
 Adelaide Fringe, the world's second-largest annual arts festival
 Fringe theatre, a name for alternative theatre
 Purple fringing, an unfocused purple or magenta "ghost" image on a photograph
 Fringe Product, a defunct Canadian record label

Television and entertainment 
 Fringe (TV series), an American science fiction television series
 The Fringe, the setting for the 2000 computer game Tachyon: The Fringe
 "The Fringe" (short story), a short story by Orson Scott Card
 "The Fringe" (Smash), a television episode

Science
 Fringe science, scientific inquiry in an established field of study that departs significantly from mainstream or orthodox theories
 Fringe search, a graph search algorithm that finds the least-cost path from a given initial node to one goal node
 Fringe of a relation, a kind of heterogeneous relation in mathematics
  Interference fringe, a pattern in wave interference

Other uses
 Fringe (hair), strands or locks of hair that fall over the scalp's front hairline to cover the forehead
 Fringe (trim), an ornamental textile trim applied to an edge of a textile item
 Fringe culture, another name for counterculture
 Fringe party, a political party in a national spectrum with a negligible share of the electorate
 Fringe theory, an idea or a collection of ideas that departs significantly from the prevailing or mainstream view in its particular field of study
 Chionanthus (common name: fringetrees), a genus of about 150 species of flowering plants in the family Oleaceae

See also